Jason Stoltenberg was the defending champion but lost in the semifinals to Wayne Ferreira.

Patrick Rafter won in the final 7–6(7–5), 7–6(7–4) against Ferreira.

Seeds

  Wayne Ferreira (final)
  Patrick Rafter (champion)
  Andrea Gaudenzi (first round)
  MaliVai Washington (second round)
  Jason Stoltenberg (semifinals)
  Stefano Pescosolido (first round)
  Greg Rusedski (quarterfinals)
  Jacco Eltingh (quarterfinals)

Draw

Finals

Top half

Bottom half

External links
 1994 Manchester Open Singles draw

Singles